Monica Moss (born Monica Susana Schütt 28 January 1974) is a Bolivian fashion designer of German descent. After initial success with her 1998 debut line An Evening of Enchantment, she has gone on to provide designs worn by celebrities including George Michael, Salma Hayek, Rob Lowe, and Sting. Her brand is known for playful colors and shapes, as well as its commitment to fair trade, sustainability, and charity. In 2007, she was recognized as "Most Out-There" by the New York Second City Style Fashion Blog.

Biography 
Monica Schütt was born on 28 January 1974 in Santa Cruz, Bolivia. In her early youth she started designing and sewing her own personal wardrobe. After her scholastic education at the German College in Santa Cruz, she went to Europe and studied fashion design in Milan. After returning to Bolivia, she created her own collections using her artist name Moss, named after her initials. Since 1998, she has been presenting her fashion in Europe, Japan and the United States and has earned international recognition under her current label Monica Moss..

References 

 Award of Second City Style Blog 
 Article in New York Post
 Article in San Antonio Express News
 Article in Bolivian Newspaper Nuevo Dia
 Article in Bolivian Newspaper El Mundo

External links 
 Official Monica Moss website
 Cubismoss
 Monica Moss acting on Bolivian Theater Stage

Images 
 Pictures of "Evening of Enchantment" Fashion Show
 Monica Moss dance contest winner on Bolivian TV
 MISS USA Tara Connor with Monica Moss
 MISS USA Tara Connor dressed in Monica Moss
 Beth Ostrosky and Katie Lee Joel dressed in Monica Moss
 James Garfunkel dressed in Monica Moss

Bolivian fashion designers
Bolivian women fashion designers
1974 births
Living people